The Spirit of St. Louis is the eighteenth studio album released by The Manhattan Transfer in 2000 by Atlantic Records. This album is the group's tribute to jazz musician Louis Armstrong.

Track listing

Personnel 
The Manhattan Transfer
 Cheryl Bentyne – vocals 
 Tim Hauser – vocals 
 Alan Paul – vocals 
 Janis Siegel – vocals 

Musicians
 Teddy Borowiecki – accordion (1, 6, 7), organ (2, 4, 10), acoustic piano (3, 5, 8, 9, 10)
 Greg Leisz – guitars, mandolin
 Chris Bruce – guitars (1)
 Smokey Hormel – guitars (2)
 David Torn – guitars (4, 10)
 David Piltch – bass 
 Abe Laboriel Jr. – drums 
 Emil Richards – vibraphone (10)
 John Rotella – clarinet (3)
 Jackie Kelso – saxophones (3)
 Plas Johnson – saxophones (3)
 Steve Berlin – saxophones (5, 8)
 John Hassell – trumpet (10)

Production 
 Craig Street – producer 
 S. Husky Hoskulds – recording, mixing 
 Ryan Boesch – engineer 
 Kevin Deen – engineer 
 Joe Zook – engineer 
 Greg Calbi – mastering 
 Benjamin Niles – art direction 
 Larry Freemantle – design
 Chris Pyle – illustration
 Roy Zipstein – photography

References / Sources
 The Manhattan Transfer Official Website

The Manhattan Transfer albums
2000 albums
Atlantic Records albums
Louis Armstrong tribute albums